Maritime Metro Transit is the public transportation system in Manitowoc, Wisconsin. It is owned and operated by the city of Manitowoc.

History
Public Transit in Manitowoc started in 1902 with a streetcar system operated by Manitowoc & Northern Traction Company. In 1922, Wisconsin Public Service Company took over operations and introduced the first buses. By 1927, the streetcars were put out of service and replaced entirely with buses. Two more private companies ran the bus system until January 1978, when the city of Manitowoc assumed operations. Originally the system was called Manitowoc Transit System, but the name was changed to Maritime Metro Transit in 1999.

Services
The transit system operates seven routes:
Route 1: Two Rivers
Route 2: Northeast Loop
Route 3: Southwest Loop
Route 4: Southeast loop
Route 5: West Loop
Route 6A: Northcentral Loop
Route 6B: Northwest Loop

Routes generally run 5am to 8pm Monday through Friday and 9am to 4pm on Saturday. There is no service on Sunday. Five of the seven routes operate from the Maritime Metro Transit Center in downtown Manitowoc.

Maritime Metro Transit Center
The Maritime Metro Transit Center, located at 915 South 11th St, is the primary transfer hub of Maritime Metro Transit. The facility was opened on October 24, 2012, replacing a former bank drive-thru, used since 1998. The transfer center serves 5 of the 7 routes with buses departing on the hour or half hour.

Ridership

The system reached its peak ridership in 1983, with a total of 401,925 rides.

See also
 Shoreline Metro
 SS Badger
 List of intercity bus stops in Wisconsin
 List of bus transit systems in the United States

References

External links

Bus transportation in Wisconsin